Shippen Township is the name of some places in the U.S. state of Pennsylvania:

Shippen Township, Cameron County, Pennsylvania
Shippen Township, Tioga County, Pennsylvania

See also:
Shippensburg Township, Pennsylvania

Pennsylvania township disambiguation pages